Phoun Sipaseuth (16 February 1920 – 8 December 1994) was a Laotian politician and member of the Lao People's Revolutionary Party (LPRP). He served as Deputy Chairman of the Council of Ministers and Ministers of Foreign Affairs during the 1980s.

He was elected to the LPP Central Committee at the 1st National Congress and retained his seat until the 5th National Congress. At the 3rd National Congress he was elected to the LPRP Politburo.

References

Specific

Bibliography
Books:
 

1920 births
1994 deaths
Members of the 1st Central Committee of the Lao People's Party
Members of the 2nd Central Committee of the Lao People's Revolutionary Party
Members of the 3rd Central Committee of the Lao People's Revolutionary Party
Members of the 4th Central Committee of the Lao People's Revolutionary Party
Members of the 5th Central Committee of the Lao People's Revolutionary Party
Members of the 2nd Politburo of the Lao People's Revolutionary Party
Members of the 3rd Politburo of the Lao People's Revolutionary Party
Members of the 4th Politburo of the Lao People's Revolutionary Party
Members of the 5th Politburo of the Lao People's Revolutionary Party
Members of the 2nd Secretariat of the Lao People's Revolutionary Party
Members of the 3rd Secretariat of the Lao People's Revolutionary Party
Deputy Prime Ministers of Laos
Government ministers of Laos
Lao People's Revolutionary Party politicians
Place of birth missing